The Royal Palace of Portici (Reggia di Portici or Palazzo Reale di Portici) is a former royal palace in Portici, Southeast of Naples along the coast, in the region of Campania, Italy. Today it is the home of the Orto Botanico di Portici, a botanical garden operated by the University of Naples Federico II. These gardens were once part of the large royal estate that included an English garden, a zoo and formal parterres.

It is located just a few metres from the Roman ruins of Herculaneum and is home to the Accademia Ercolanese, the deposit for all found objects of archaeological site. This is in effect the Museum of Herculaneum, opened in 1758 by King Charles.

History

On 3 July 1735 at the age of 18, Infante Charles of Spain was crowned the King of Naples and Sicily. He had taken control of the two kingdoms by military force opposing the powerful Charles VI, Holy Roman Emperor. In 1738, Charles and his consort Princess Maria Amalia of Saxony were favourably impressed with the area of Portici when they visited the villa of Emmanuel Maurice, the Duke of Elbeuf. The couple commissioned this palace in Portici to serve not only as a private residence, but as a place to receive foreign officials travelling to the kingdom.

Work began at the end of 1738 under the direction of Antonio Canevari. Canevari had helped the royal couple in construction of the Neapolitan Palace of Capodimonte. The interiors of the Palace of Portici were frescoed by Giuseppe Bonito, while the gardens were decorated with marble sculptures by Joseph Canart.

Portions of ancient Roman villas and noble residences were discovered in preparing the foundations of the palace, and excavation of the area revealed numerous works of art, among them temple with 24 marble columns. This discovery was put in the Museum of Portici, built for the occasion, and annexed to the Accademia Ercolanese. The museum was founded by Charles in 1755 also to house the findings from the excavations of Herculaneum.

Since the new royal palace was not large enough to house the whole court, it stimulated construction of other grand residences in the neighborhood, 122 of which are now known as the Vesuvian Villas. This also led to the expansion of the Palace of Capodimonte. Charles and his wife kept the Portici Palace as their summer residence and seven of their twelve children were born there.

Upon King Charles' accession to the Spanish throne in 1759, he left his Neapolitan and Sicilian domains to his third son, Prince Ferdinand who would rule until his death in 1825. During the reign of Ferdinand, the palace was overshadowed by the far grander Caserta Palace which became the official home of the court from 1759. Portici was the private home of Prince Felipe of Naples and Sicily, the eldest son of Charles III of Spain. Prince Felipe was mentally disabled and lived in the palace until his death there on 19 September 1777.

In the spring of 1769, the palace hosted Joseph II, Holy Roman Emperor. In 1770, a fourteen-year-old Mozart stayed there. In 1799, King Ferdinand added an opera house to the palace. During the Napoleonic occupation, General Joachim Murat refurnished the palace with French furniture.

In 1804, the Queen Consort, Maria Isabella of Spain, gave birth here to her first child, Princess Luisa Carlotta. Luisa Carlota would marry her uncle, the Spanish Infante Francisco de Paula. On September 13, 1848, Queen Maria Isabella died at the palace aged 59. Today the palace accommodates the seat of the Faculty of Agriculture of the University of Naples Federico II.

In 1834,Corografia dell'Italia describes the Palazzo Portici, as being built by King Charles:

<blockquote>
to increase the glory of the royal autumnal vacations, of which it formed the center. Towards 1750 it was used to store the collection of precious things that had been discovered in Herculaneum and in Pompeii. The building is on three floors, and is rectangular, 400 feet from east to west, and 360 feet wide. The principal prospect is of the sea; the large courtyard is octagonal, but has the singularity, or rather the disadvantage, of carrying the main thoroughfare that leads from Naples to Salerno, to Sannio, to Apulia and Calabria. Inside that big courtyard are the royal apartments, the sumptuous galleries that contained the fine museum, unique in the world, for the quantity of statues, bronzes, bas reliefs, pots, candelabras, and tools of every type found in the excavations of the above-mentioned two towns, and that today are part of the Bourbon Museum. What is seen however, and what is not found in other royal palaces, is that has floors composed of ancient Greek or Roman mosaics. The galleries however are not entirely devoted to precious objects; one also finds a fine collection of paintings of the Italian, French and Flemish schools. The gardens are at the east on the slopes of Vesuvius: they are immense, little adorned, but with many trees that are always green, especially service and arbutus trees, which feed the thrushes that abound there.</blockquote>

Architecture

The entrance presents a spacious and majestic façade terraced and equipped with balustrades; the center of the palace is a large quadrangle of which there are two gateways which allowed traffic to pass through; this thoroughfare was once called the Strada delle Calabrie or Road of Calabria. It is today called the via Università. The palace has two large parks: on the West overlooking the Gulf of Naples, and on the East looking towards Mount Vesuvius.

On the left side of the courtyard of the palace is the barracks of the Royal Guards (Caserma delle Guardie Reali) and the Palatine Chapel (Cappella Palatina of 1749), while a majestic salon (1741) leads from the vestibule to the first floor, where the apartment of Caroline Bonaparte is. The salon is richly decorated in Louis XIV style, and the boudoir of the Queen Maria Amalia of Saxony has walls decorated in porcelain of the Capodimonte Porcelain Factory which Maria Amalia helped found in 1743.

Park
The palace's park, called Giardino della Regina, originally extended from Pugliano towards Vesuvius down to  Granatello, towards the sea. It was divided into two parks, the lower having spacious avenues surrounding English gardens. It held works of art including the Fountain of the Sirens (Fontana delle Sirene), the Kiosk of King Carlo (Chiosco di Re Carlo) the Fountain of the Swans (Fontana dei Cigni''), and an amphitheatre.

In the upper park was Charles's private zoo with kangaroos, an elephant, two lions, two panthers, four antelopes,  an African lioness, a puma, two American tapirs and a porcupine. This novelty was kept by King Ferdinand who maintained that it was to remain on show to foreign dignitaries.

See also 
 List of Baroque residences

References

External links
 Official website 
 Salottino di porcellana 
  Google Maps of the site; with picture

Royal residences in the Kingdom of Naples
Gardens in Campania
Portici
Portici
Portici
Baroque architecture in Campania
Museums in Campania
Houses completed in 1742
Buildings and structures in the Metropolitan City of Naples
1742 establishments in Italy
University of Naples Federico II
1742 establishments in the Kingdom of Naples